Ati is a city in Chad, the capital of the region of Batha. The town is served by Ati Airport.

Demographics

Notable people 

 Fatimé Dordji - Chad's first female radio announcer

References

Populated places in Chad
Batha Region